Circle of Love is the debut studio album by the American vocal group Sister Sledge, released in 1975 by Atco Records. Featuring Kathy Sledge on vocals, the album includes the songs "Circle of Love (Caught in the Middle)" and "Love Don't Go Through No Changes on Me". The album was described as a mix of pop and soul in a 1975 Billboard Magazine review.

Background
At the time of this release, all members of the group were still teenagers; the oldest member Debbie Sledge was nineteen years old, studying at Tyler College of Art, Joni Sledge was an eighteen-year-old college freshman at Temple University, Kim Sledge was in her senior year of high school at Olney High School in their hometown of Philadelphia; and the youngest, Kathy, was a 15-year-old 10th–grader. This album gained moderate commercial success, Their single "Love Don't You Go Through No Changes on Me", reached number thirty–one on the Hot R&B/Soul Singles charts by mid 1975. The song was performed along with "Circle of Love (Caught in the Middle)" on an episode of Soul Train, which aired in April 1975.

Track listing
All tracks composed by Gwen Guthrie and Patrick Grant; except where indicated

"Circle of Love (Caught in the Middle)" (Fay Hauser, Patrick Adams) – 3:30
"Cross My Heart" – 3:22
"Protect Our Love" – 4:10
"Give in to Love" (Linda Creed, Thom Bell) – 4:55
"Love Don't You Go Through No Changes On Me" – 3:24
"Don't You Miss Him Now" – 3:15
"Pain Reliever" – 3:30
"You're Much Better Off Loving Me" – 3:17
"Fireman" (Guthrie, Grant, Charles Sampson) – 3:40

Personnel
 Debbie Sledge, Joni Sledge, Kathy Sledge, Kim Sledge - vocals
 Bert "Super Charts" DeCoteaux - arrangements, conductor
 Bob Defrin - art direction
 Bob Babbitt, Patrick Grant - bass
 Billy King, Carlos Martin - bongos
 Kermit Moore, Seymour Barab - cello
 Billy King, Carlos Martin - congos
 Jimmy Young - drums
 Bob Clearmountain, Tony Bongiovi - engineer
 Ellen Libman, Ron St. Germain - assistant engineer
 Donald Corrado, Jim Buffington - French horn
 Jeff Mironov, Jerry Friedman, John Tropea - guitar
 Derek Smith, Pat Rebillot, Ricky Hughric - keyboards
 Dennis King - mastering
 David Carey, George Devens, Joe Venuto, Phil Kraus - percussion
 Armen Kachaturian - cover photography
 Buzz Brauner, Frank Wess, George Marge - reeds, woodwind
 Al Cobbs, Alan Raph, Garnett Brown, Jack Jeffers - trombone
 Ernie Royal, James Sedlar, Jimmy Owens - trumpet
 Alfred Brown, Julien Barber, Seymour Berman - viola
 Gene Orloff, Harold Kohon, Irving Spice, Isadora Kohon, Louis Haber, Louis Stone, Michael Comins, Noel DaCosta, Sanford Allen - violin

References

Sister Sledge albums
1975 debut albums
Atco Records albums